Petrus Riga (c. 1140 – 1209) was a French poet. He is known for his work Aurora, which is a commentary on the Bible with emphasis on allegorical and moral interpretation. Although it has been called the verse Bible (Biblia versificata) of the middleages it is not just a collection of versified paraphrases.

He was a canon of Reims Cathedral, and wrote many works. He was an influence on John Gower. Vox Clamantis contains several passages taken from Aurora. Gower cites Riga as an authority in Book III Chapter 25.

References
Paul E. Beichner (1965, two volumes), Aurora: Petri Rigae Biblia Versificata. A Verse Commentary on the Bible

Notes

External links
Opera Omnia
 Folio images

1140s births
1209 deaths
Medieval Latin poets
French poets
French male poets